Kyzh is a rural locality (a village) in Dobryansky District, Perm Krai, Russia. The population was 6 as of 2010. There are 5 streets.

Geography 
Kyzh is located 52 km northeast of Dobryanka (the district's administrative centre) by road. Vilva is the nearest rural locality.

References 

Rural localities in Dobryansky District